Alex Nahíd Güity Barrios (born 20 September 1997) is a Honduran professional footballer who plays as a goalkeeper for Olimpia and the Honduras national team.

Club career
Güity made his professional debut with Olimpia in a 0–0 Liga Nacional draw with F.C. Motagua on 8 April 2019.

International career
Güity made his debut for Honduras national football team on 12 June 2021 in a friendly against Mexico. Later he was selected for the Honduras Olympic team and appeared in all three games they played at the Olympics.

Honours
Honduras U23
Pan American Silver Medal: 2019

Honduras
CONCACAF Nations League third place: 2021

Individual
CONCACAF Men's Olympic Qualifying Tournament Golden Glove: 2020
CONCACAF Men's Olympic Qualifying Tournament Best XI: 2020

Personal life
Güity's half-brother, Ricardo Barrios, is also a professional footballer.

References

External links
 

1997 births
Living people
Sportspeople from Tegucigalpa
Honduran footballers
Honduras youth international footballers
Honduras international footballers
Association football goalkeepers
C.D. Olimpia players
Lobos UPNFM players
C.D. Victoria players
Liga Nacional de Fútbol Profesional de Honduras players
Footballers at the 2020 Summer Olympics
Olympic footballers of Honduras
Pan American Games silver medalists for Honduras
Pan American Games medalists in football
Footballers at the 2019 Pan American Games
Medalists at the 2019 Pan American Games